The Princess Charlotte-class ships of the line were a class of two 104-gun first rates of the Royal Navy. They were built to an enlarged version of the lines of Sir Thomas Slade's .

Ships

Builder: Portsmouth Dockyard
Ordered: 19 June 1813
Launched: 14 September 1825
Fate: Sold, 1875

Builder: Plymouth Dockyard
Ordered: 6 January 1812
Launched: 28 July 1828
Fate: Sold, 1905

References
Lavery, Brian (2003) The Ship of the Line - Volume 1: The development of the battlefleet 1650-1850. Conway Maritime Press. .

 
Ship of the line classes